GoEuro Travel GmbH, doing business as Omio, formerly known as GoEuro, is a German online travel comparison and booking website based in Berlin, Germany. It was founded in 2013 as GoEuro by Naren Shaam.

Omio employs more than 300 people and is active in 37 countries globally.

The website is available in 21 languages. It offers travelers the ability to organize transportation requirements such as trains, planes, buses, etc by using their easy-to-use platform. It covers 207 European airports, over ten thousand central bus stations, and over twenty thousand train stations.

In 2019, the website rebranded itself as Omio and acquired the Australian travel website Rome2rio.

In January 2020, Omio expanded to Canada, and the United States.

References

Companies based in Berlin
German companies established in 2013
Online travel agencies
Internet properties established in 2013
German travel websites
International multimodal travel search engines